This is a list of singles that peaked in the top 10 of the Billboard Hot 100 during 2007.

T-Pain and Akon each had seven top-ten hits in 2007, tying them for the most top-ten hits during the year.

Top-ten singles
Key
 – indicates single's top 10 entry was also its Hot 100 debut
 – indicates Best performing song of the year
(#) – 2007 year-end top 10 single position and rank

2006 peaks

2008 peaks

See also
2007 in music
Hot 100 number-one hits of 2007 (United States)
 Billboard Year-End Hot 100 singles of 2007

References

General sources

Joel Whitburn Presents the Billboard Hot 100 Charts: The 2000s
Additional information obtained can be verified within Billboard's online archive services and print editions of the magazine.

External links
Billboard.com

2007
United States Hot 100 Top Ten